Edilberto Kaindong Tiempo (August 5, 1913 – September 19, 1996) was a Filipino writer and professor.  He and his wife, Edith L. Tiempo, are credited by Silliman University with establishing "a tradition in excellence in creative writing and the teaching of literacy craft which continues to this day" at that university.

Career
During his tenure there, he was department chair (1950 to 1969), graduate school dean,  vice-president for academic affairs, and writer-in-residence. Tiempo was also a part-time professor in St. Paul University Dumaguete, teaching fine arts, drama, and graduate school.

As a Guggenheim writing fellow in 1955, he submitted a  collection of short stories, A Stream at Dalton Pass and Other Stories, for his Ph.D.  in English at the University of Denver. This collection won a prize at the same time that his second novel, More Than Conquerors, won the first prize for the novel.

Tiempo and his wife studied with Paul Engle in the Iowa Writers' Workshop, graduating in 1962; their experience there inspired them to found the  Silliman National Writers Workshop, the first in Asia, which has been in operation since then.

Tiempo was also a Rockefeller fellow. In addition to his career at Silliman, Tiempo taught fiction and literary criticism for four years in two American schools during the 1960s.

Works 
His novel, Cry Slaughter, published in 1957 was a revised version of his Watch in the Night novel published four years earlier in the Philippines. Cry Slaughter had four printings by Avon in New York, a hardbound edition in London, and six European translations.

Novels
Watch in the Night (1953)
Cry Slaughter! (1957)
To Be Free (1972)
More Than Conquerors (1982)
Cracked Mirror (1984)
The Standard Bearer (1985)
Farah (2001)

Poetry
Inside Job

Collections
Stream at Dalton Pass and Other Stories (1970)
Finality, a novelette and five short stories (1982)
Rainbow for Rima (1988)
Snake Twin and Other Stories (1992)
The Paraplegics And Five Short Stories (1995)
Literary Criticism In The Philippines And Other Essays (1995)

Awards

 Cultural Center of the Philippines (CCP) Prize
 Palanca Awards
 U.P. Golden Anniversary Literary Contest
 National Book Award

References

External links
 Photograph of Edilberto K. Tiempo
 Collection from the Miriam College Library
Collection from the Library of the University of the Philippines, Diliman
 "The Witch", one of Tiempo's short stories, from a Northern Illinois University website

Filipino writers
1913 births
1996 deaths
Iowa Writers' Workshop alumni
Silliman University people
Place of birth missing